The general speed limits in Austria are as follows:

References

Austria
Roads in Austria